The 1978 Delaware Fightin' Blue Hens football team represented the University of Delaware as an independent during the 1978 NCAA Division II football season. They were led by 13th-year head coach Tubby Raymond and played their home games at Delaware Stadium in Newark, Delaware.

Schedule

References

Delaware
Delaware Fightin' Blue Hens football seasons
Delaware Fightin' Blue Hens football